Karam Alahi (also Romanized as Karam Alahī) is a village in Honam Rural District, in the Central District of Selseleh County, Lorestan Province, Iran. At the 2006 census, its population was 73, in 13 families.

References 

Towns and villages in Selseleh County